The 2017–18 Belgian Third Amateur Division is the second season of the division in its current format, replacing the former Belgian Fourth Division.

Team changes

In
 Menen, Grimbergen, Woluwe-Zaventem, Couvin-Mariembourg, Givry and Namur were all relegated from the 2016–17 Belgian Second Amateur Division.
 Ternesse, Termien, Melsele and Wingene were promoted as champions of the Flemish Belgian Provincial Leagues, respectively in Antwerp, Limburg, East Flanders and West Flanders.
 Binche, Stockay, Habay, Spy were promoted as champions of the Walloon Belgian Provincial Leagues, respectively in Hainaut, Liège, Luxembourg and Namur.
 Kampenhout was promoted as champion of the region matching the old Province of Brabant, comprising all Flemish and French speaking teams in both Flemish Brabant, Walloon Brabant and Brussels.
 Hoeilaart was the runner up of the Province of Brabant region and was also promoted as Halle folded as a team and an extra place became available.
 Bilzen Waltwilder, Heur-Tongeren, Herentals and Stekene were promoted through the interprovincial play-offs on VFV side.
 Visé and Braine were promoted through the interprovincial play-offs on ACFF side.

Out
 Ingelmunster was promoted after winning the 2016–17 Belgian Third Amateur Division A.
 Turnhout was promoted after winning the 2016–17 Belgian Third Amateur Division B.
 RWDM47 was promoted after winning the 2016–17 Belgian Third Amateur Division C.
 Durbuy was promoted after winning the 2016–17 Belgian Third Amateur Division D.
 City Pirates, Pepingen,  Ronse, Sint-Lenaarts, Vosselaar were promoted as winners of the Third Amateur Division promotion play-offs VFV.
 Rebecq was promoted as winners of the Third Amateur Division promotion play-offs ACFF.
 Berlare, Sint-Gillis Waas, Zele, Helchteren, Betekom, Racing Mechelen, Profondeville, Warnant and Arlon were relegated to the Belgian Provincial Leagues.

Takeover
 Charleroi Fleurus was relegated from the 2016–17 Belgian Second Amateur Division but sold its matricule licence to an entrepreneur establishing a new club in La Louvière to revive the defunct club RAA La Louvière, the new club will be named RAAL La Louvière.

Belgian Third Amateur Division A

League table

Belgian Third Amateur Division B

League table

Belgian Third Amateur Division C

League table

Belgian Third Amateur Division D

League table

Championship matches
Both the two VFV and two ACFF teams winning their leagues will play a title match to determine the overall VFV and ACFF champions of the Belgian Third Division. The overall ACFF champion will be determined over two legs while Menen and Heur-Tongeren will play for the VFV title in a single match at the stadium of Menen (determined by draw). There will be no match between the overall VFV and ACFF champions.

Championship match VFV

The match was not played as Menen forfeited the game, Heur-Tongeren is the official VFV champion.

Championship match ACFF

First Leg

Second Leg

With an aggregate score of 3-3, Tilleur won the encounter on away goals and was crowned overall ACFF champion of the 2017–18 Belgian Third Amateur Division.

Promotion play-offs

Promotion play-offs VFV
The teams finishing in second place in the Third Amateur Division A and Third Amateur Division B will take part in a promotion playoff first round together with three period winners from both divisions. These 8 teams from the VFV will play the first round of a promotion-playoff, with two teams promoting to the 2018–19 Belgian Second Amateur Division. Depending on the number of VFV teams relegating from the 2017–18 Belgian First Amateur Division and possible mergers and bankruptcies, more teams might get promoted. As a result, the two winning teams in the VFV Round 2 immediately received promotion, while the other teams continued the play-offs to determine the order in which possible further places would be awarded.

In Division A, champions Menen and second placed Dikkelvenne each won one periods, allowing the next three teams in the league to take part: Wingene, Eppegem and Wetteren. In Division B, the two periods were won by champion Heur-Tongeren while second placed Wellen won the remaining period. Hence the teams in overall positions 3 to 5 took part: Termien, Diegem Sport and Leopoldsburg.

VFV Round 1

The four winners will continue into the VFV Round 2 where one extra place is available.

VFV Round 2

Diegem and Eppegem were promoted to the 2018–19 Belgian Second Amateur Division, while Dikkelvenne and Termien moved to the VFV Round 3 to play for the order on the waiting list in case any remaining places came up.

VFV Round 3

Following the bankruptcy of Lierse in the Belgian First Division B, an extra spot became available. As the winner of round 3, Dikkelvenne was promoted to take up this free spot. Termien remains in the Belgian Third Amateur Division.

Promotion play-offs ACFF
The team finishing in second place in the Third Amateur Division C and Third Amateur Division D will take part in a promotion playoff first round together with three period winners from both divisions. These 8 teams from the ACFF will play the first round of a promotion-playoff, with normally one team promoting to the 2018–19 Belgian Second Amateur Division although more places could come up which is why the third round also features a match between the losers of the second round.

In Division C, Couvin-Mariembourg and Onhaye managed to each win one period. As the other period was won by champions La Louvière, the remaining spots in the play-offs went to second placed Francs Borains and fourth placed Tournai. In Division D, the champions Tilleur had won two periods, the other went to Visé who were joined in the play-offs by the teams finishing 3rd to 5th, Stockay, Aische and Herstal.

ACFF Round 1

The four winners moved on to Round 2 while the losers are eliminated.

ACFF Round 2

The winners would normally move on to Round 3 to play for promotion, however this season two teams were promoted directly and therefore the match was not necessary as both Francs Borains and Visé were promoted. The losers play a match to determine third place in case extra promotion places would come up.

Third place match

As one extra spot became available, Couvin-Mariembourg was also promoted. Aische remained in the Belgian Third Amateur Division.

Relegation play-offs

ACFF

As no teams from the ACFF wing relegated from the 2017–18 Belgian First Amateur Division, both teams were eventually spared from relegation.

VFV

At the time of the match, it was yet uncertain how many teams from each wing would be relegated. In the end, with the relegations of Hamme, Berchem Sport and Patro Eisden Maasmechelen from the 2017–18 Belgian First Amateur Division and the addition bankruptcy of Lierse (playing in the 2017–18 Belgian First Division B), which are all VFV teams, both Diest and Ninove were eventually relegated.

References

Belgian Third Amateur Division
Bel
5